Guilherme Cavalcanti (1 February 1921 – 2006) was a Brazilian sports shooter. He competed in the 25 m pistol event at the 1952 Summer Olympics.

References

External links
 

1921 births
2006 deaths
Brazilian male sport shooters
Olympic shooters of Brazil
Shooters at the 1952 Summer Olympics
Place of birth missing